Green Boys may refer to:
 Green Boys of Dublin, 1781 Irish regiment in the American Revolutionary War
 FC Green Boys 77 Harlange-Tarchamps, Luxembourg football club

See also
 Mad Green Boys, fanclub of Jeonbuk Hyundai Motors football club
 Green Mountain Boys, 18th-century militia in the New York–New Hampshire area
 "The Boys in Green", Republic of Ireland national football team song for the 1988 European Championship finals